Paul Butler (Irish: Pól de Buitléir) is a republican politician in Northern Ireland and a former member of the Provisional Irish Republican Army. He served as a member of the Northern Ireland Assembly for Lagan Valley from 2007 to 2011.

Involvement in the Troubles

At the age of 17, Butler was convicted of killing 50-year-old reserve Royal Ulster Constabulary officer.  As a result, he spent 15 years in jail.

Lisburn City Council

Paul Butler is the leader of the Sinn Féin group on the Lisburn City Council.  The party currently holds four seats on the council, making it the third party and the largest nationalist party.
Butler has a served as a Councillor for Lisburn City Council since 1997 and is a member of their Strategic Policy, Planning and Finance Committees. Butler claims he campaigns against discrimination on the council, culminating in the Irish Government sending a representative to witness council proceedings.  Nationalists claim that the unionist majority on the council has prevented nationalists from taking council positions.  Butler campaigned for the town to gain city status which was bestowed on the city by the British Monarch.

Westminster elections

Butler stood in the UK general elections in 2001 and 2005 in the Lagan Valley constituency but was not elected. In the 2005 general election, Sinn Féin received the largest share of the vote by a nationalist party, overtaking the SDLP.

Standing down
Butler announced that he will not contest the May Assembly elections after only one term as an MLA. "I am standing down," confirmed Butler. "The Party's position on this is that anyone who is a councillor and an MLA should only have one job."

Assembly elections

Results of the election to the Northern Irish Assembly, Lagan Valley, 2003

Patricia Lewsley was appointed as Children's Commissioner and was replaced as an MLA by Marietta Farrell

Results of the election to the Northern Irish Assembly, Lagan Valley, 2007

Butler became the first Sinn Féin member for Lagan Valley in the Northern Irish Assembly.  He won the SDLP seat previously held by Patricia Lewsley and subsequently Marietta Farrell.  Butler was the only nationalist elected in the six-seater constituency.

Notes and references

Irish republicans
Living people
Northern Ireland MLAs 2007–2011
Provisional Irish Republican Army members
Republicans imprisoned during the Northern Ireland conflict
Sinn Féin MLAs
Year of birth missing (living people)
Sinn Féin councillors in Northern Ireland
Members of Lisburn City Council
Sinn Féin parliamentary candidates